(pronounced "Tekken Cross Street Fighter") was going to be a crossover fighting game that was being developed by Bandai Namco Entertainment. It was supposed to cross the universes of Namco's Tekken and Capcom's Street Fighter into one game, creating a roster from both franchises. The game was announced at the 2010 San Diego Comic-Con International by Bandai Namco producer Katsuhiro Harada. The gameplay of Tekken X Street Fighter was going to feature the same 3D fighting game engine of the Tekken franchise, as opposed to Street Fighter X Tekken, which features the 2D-style gameplay of Street Fighter IV.

Bandai Namco put the game's development on hold in 2016. In June 2021, Harada reiterated that "no one really knows for certain at this point."

Characters

Development
Tekken X Street Fighter was announced on July 24, 2010 at the 2010 San Diego Comic-Con along with the Capcom-produced Street Fighter X Tekken. The gameplay of Tekken X Street Fighter was going to feature the same 3D fighting game engine of the Tekken franchise as opposed to Street Fighter X Tekken which features the 2D styled gameplay of Street Fighter IV. The game was planned to be released for the PlayStation 3 and Xbox 360 consoles; however, owing to the discontinuation for both of the consoles, they were soon changed for both the PlayStation 4 and Xbox One instead. Ryu and Jin Kazama appear on the game's promotional poster (shadowed by their alter-egos "Evil Ryu" and "Devil Jin" respectively). It was still in its early stages of development and no images or videos were released at the 2010 Comic-Con. Katsuhiro Harada did reveal some concepts at Gamescom 2010 such as a prototype model of Ryu, with the gi of Tekkens Paul Phoenix. He said the team has yet to finish the model as details and lighting were not completed.

This is not the first time Namco and Capcom have made a game together as they released a Japan-only crossover game in 2005 for the PlayStation 2 titled Namco × Capcom. However, this game consisted of characters outside of the Street Fighter universe as well as the Tekken universe and instead included various characters from Capcom and ones from Namco (like the Darkstalkers and Soulcalibur series, for example), and at least two characters exclusive to the game. Namco × Capcom was a role playing game, thus making Tekken X Street Fighter and Street Fighter X Tekken the first games in the fighting game genre to be made by Namco and Capcom.

On March 4, 2012, Namco released a poll on the Tekken Facebook page asking fans to vote for who they would like to see on Tekken X Street Fighter'''s roster. There were 55 Tekken characters and 66 Street Fighter characters to choose from, and fans were able to choose five of their favorites from each series. In March 2012, Tekken producer Katsuhiro Harada clarified that the poll would not decide the final roster, but will instead be used in conjunction with various research methods to determine the character lineup. In April 2012, Harada stated that the game was about 10% complete. At the 2014 San Diego Comic-Con, Harada confirmed that the game was still in development, with the reason for the scarce information being due to Bandai Namco waiting for the opportunity to market it.

In 2015, Harada stated that development had come far along. In December of the same year, Street Fighter Akuma was announced as a playable guest character in Tekken 7: Fated Retribution, though no statement was made as to whether this was an indicator of the crossover title's status.

In April 2016, Harada stated that development on the game was officially on hold, with the reason being given as to not split the communities behind both franchises. He reiterated this during a 2018 year-end party livestream, while also revealing that the game was about 30% complete.

In May 2019, Harada states that he still wants to release the game, but his “logical and business” sense has him questioning whether he actually should. In December 2019, Harada posted a poll on his Twitter account, asking the community how much they still were waiting for the game.

In June 2021, during a broadcast of his "Harada's Bar Radio" YouTube show, it was believed that Harada confirmed Tekken X Street Fighter had been officially cancelled; however, he later clarified that no one has a clue anymore. According to Harada, the game was about 30% complete when development was halted in 2016, and some of the animations they had created for the game had been reused for Akuma in Tekken 7.

See alsoNamco × Capcom, Namco's tactical role-playing crossover game released in 2005.Project X Zone, follow-up to Namco × Capcom with the addition of Sega characters to the cast, released in 2012.Project X Zone 2, a 2015 sequel, with the addition of Nintendo characters to the cast.Street Fighter X Tekken, Capcom's take on the Tekken'' crossover.

Notes

References

Bandai Namco games
Fighting games
Crossover fighting games
Namco games
Street Fighter games
Tekken games
Vaporware video games
Video games with 2.5D graphics
Video games developed in Japan
Cancelled PlayStation 3 games
Cancelled PlayStation 4 games
Cancelled Windows games
Cancelled Xbox 360 games
Cancelled Xbox One games
Multiplayer and single-player video games